A general election was held in the United Kingdom on Thursday, 7 June 2001 and all 72 seats in Scotland were contested. There was only one Scottish seat which changed parties during the election; that of Galloway and Upper Nithsdale which Peter Duncan of the Conservative Party gained from Alisdair Morgan of the SNP, by just 74 votes. Apart from the Conservatives increasing their representation to a single seat, the election was essentially a repeat of the previous result four years earlier; with Labour still the largest party in terms of seats won.

Results

Below is a table summarising the results of the 2001 general election in Scotland.

Votes summary

Outcome

The result saw very little change from the last contest in 1997, though after being wiped out in Scotland four years earlier, this time the Conservatives managed to win one seat. A notable feature of the election was that turnout fell to 58%, which reportedly caused all of Scotland's political parties to be "worried about voter apathy".

Although Conservatives once again a Scottish MP, their vote actually share fell compared with 1997 and in vote share terms the fell to fourth place. On top of this they failed to win several target seats including Edinburgh Pentlands where former MP Malcolm Rifkind failed to regain the seat and Eastwood where Labour incumbent Jim Murphy substantial increased his majority over the Scottish Conservative Chairman Raymond Robertson. The Conservatives did  come close to gaining  Perth where Liz Smith came within 50 votes of taking the seat from the SNP. David McLetchie, the Scottish Conservative leader, said that one seat was "better than nothing".

As well as losing Galloway and Upper Nithsdale to the Conservatives the SNP failed to take any of their target seats and saw a decline in their share of the vote, though still had the second highest vote share in Scotland. Nevertheless the former SNP leader Alex Salmond said "consolidating as the second party in Scotland is no mean achievement" and put the party in a good position for the 2003 Scottish Parliament election.

Although Labour held all its seats it also saw a decline in its vote share. In contrast the Liberal Democrats increased their vote share, though they did not win any additional seats. The new Scottish Socialist Party had set themselves what leader Tommy Sheridan called an "ambitious" target of 100,000 votes they ultimately polled 70,000 votes. Sheridan attributed this to the significant drop in turnout compared with 1997.

References

Scotland
2001 in Scotland
2000s elections in Scotland
2001